Histocidaris is a genus of sea urchins in the family Histocidaridae. Some species are known from the fossil record.

Species 
 Histocidaris acutispina Mortensen, 1927
 Histocidaris australiae Mortensen, 1928
 Histocidaris carinata Mortensen, 1928
 Histocidaris cobosi (A. Agassiz, 1898)
 Histocidaris crassispina Mortensen, 1928
 Histocidaris denticulata Koehler, 1927
 Histocidaris elegans (A. Agassiz, 1879)
 Histocidaris formosa Mortensen, 1928
 Histocidaris geneffensis Lambert, 1932 †
 Histocidaris longicollis Hoggett & Rowe, 1986
 Histocidaris magnifica Mortensen, 1928
 Histocidaris mckayi Fell, 1954 †
 Histocidaris misakiensis (Yoshiwara, 1898)
 Histocidaris nuttingi Mortensen, 1926
 Histocidaris oranensis Lambert, 1931 †
 Histocidaris purpurata (Thomson, 1872)
 Histocidaris recurvata Mortensen, 1928
 Histocidaris sharreri (A. Agassiz, 1880)
 Histocidaris variabilis (A. Agassiz & H.L. Clark, 1907)

References

Cidaroida genera
Histocidaridae
Taxa named by Ole Theodor Jensen Mortensen